Totally T-Boz is an American reality documentary miniseries on TLC. The four-episode series premiered on January 1, 2013. Filmed in October 2012, Totally T-Boz follows Tionne "T-Boz" Watkins as she works on her new music career. As a member of TLC, the series also sheds light on Watkins working on 20th Anniversary plans with Rozonda "Chilli" Thomas and healing from the death of Lisa "Left Eye" Lopes. Watkins has stated via Twitter that she has no interest in continuing the series.

Cast
 Tionne "T-Boz" Watkins
 Chase Anela Rolison
 Tae Tae
 Barb
 Tara Brivic
 Kayo Watkins
 Christopher "Cousin Chris" Hughes

Episodes

References

2010s American reality television series
2013 American television series debuts
2013 American television series endings
English-language television shows
TLC (TV network) original programming
Television shows set in Atlanta
Television shows set in Los Angeles